Charles-François Thaon de Revel et de Saint-André (28 February 1725 – 14 December 1807) was an army commander for the Kingdom of Sardinia during the War of the First Coalition. He fought in the War of the Austrian Succession and during the years of peace gained promotion until he was made major general in 1780. He was forced to abandon Nice to the invading Republican French army in 1792. The following year he defeated the French at Saorgio. He played a minor part in 1799 during the War of the Second Coalition. He went to Sardinia after the end of that conflict and died at Cagliari.

References
Some of the content of this article comes from the equivalent French-language Wikipedia article (retrieved September 19, 2015).

Italian generals
Military leaders of the French Revolutionary Wars
Italian people of the French Revolutionary Wars
18th-century Italian military personnel
People from Nice
1725 births
1807 deaths